Yerevan City Council elections were held on 14 May 2017. The Republican Party of Armenia won 71.25% of the total vote, the Way Out Alliance won 21%, while Yerkir Tsirani won 7.75%. Following the elections, Yerevan City Council elected Taron Margaryan as Mayor of Yerevan.

Parties 
Three parties were registered to participate, each with its candidate for Mayor:
 Republican Party of Armenia — Taron Margaryan 
 Way Out Alliance — Nikol Pashinyan 
 Yerkir Tsirani — Zaruhi Postanjyan

Results

References 

Yerevan
Yerevan City Council election
Local elections in Armenia
Armenia
Armenia
Armenia
Armenia
21st century in Yerevan